Ademar Jürlau (28 March 1907 – 20 June 1995) was an Estonian athletics competitor.

He was born in Tartu.

He competed at 1934 European Athletics Championships in 1500 m (placed 8th) and 800 m (didn't advance to quarter-final). He is multiple-times Estonian champion in different running disciplines. He represented Estonian national athletics team for 13 times.

During WW II he was mobilized into Red Army.

References

1907 births
1995 deaths
Estonian male middle-distance runners
Sportspeople from Tartu